John Stewart, Earl of Mar and Garioch (c. 1456c. 1479) was the youngest surviving son of James II of Scotland and Mary of Guelders.

After a legal struggle, in 1457 James II obtained from a justiciary court at Aberdeen a recognition of the Crown's right to the earldom and its lands, and bestowed the titles of Earl of Mar and Earl of Garioch on his son sometime between 1458 and 1459. In 1479, John was accused of treason by the means of witchcraft against the king and imprisoned at Craigmillar Castle. Shortly thereafter he died in suspicious circumstances, possibly on the orders of his brother James III.

Ancestors

References

John
Earls or mormaers of Mar
Scottish princes
1450s births

1470s deaths

Peers created by James II of Scotland
Sons of kings

Year of birth uncertain
Year of death uncertain